The Harla, also known as Harala, Karanla, Harla Koombe, Haralla or Arla, are an ethnic group that once inhabited Djibouti, Ethiopia and northern and Eastern Somalia. They spoke the now-extinct Harla language, which belonged to either the Cushitic or Semitic branches of the Afroasiatic family. There are existing books like "The Book of Obligations" in Old Harari written roughly 500 years ago, when Hararis were referred to as "Harla" at that time as attested to in the Conquest of Abyssinia.

History
 
The Harla are credited by the present-day inhabitants of parts of Djibouti, Ethiopia, and northern Somalia with having constructed various historical sites. Although now mostly lying in ruins, these structures include stone necropoleis, store pits, mosques and houses. Cave drawings are also attributed to the Harla.

Tradition states one of Harla's main towns was Metehara and the area between Harar and Dire Dawa is still referred to as Harla. The Harla inhabited Tchertcher and various other areas in the Horn of Africa, where they erected various tumuli. According to historian Richard Wilding, tales indicate Harla lived in the interior of Ogaden and by the seashores prior to Somali and Oromo movements into these regions.

The Harla Kingdom existed as early as the sixth century; it would later be influenced by Islam sometime in the eighth century. In the ninth century, the earliest known Muslim kingdom in the Horn of Africa, the Maḥzūmī dynasty's Sultanate of Shewa, sprang up in Harla country. The Maḥzūmī capital of Walale was in Northern Hararghe.

According to folklore, the Harla reportedly had a queen named Arawelo, who ruled much of the eastern parts of the Horn of Africa. In Zeila, a clan called Harla claims to be related to the ancient people. Locals in Zeila also attested that the old town of Amud was built by the Harla.

The influx of Arab immigrants such as Ābadir ʻUmar Āl-Rida into Harla territory would lead to the development of the town of Harar, known then as Gē. Harar would become the leading center of Islam in the Horn of Africa. Archaeologist Timothy Insoll discovered stoneware in Harla town resembling that found in Harar.

According to the Harari chronicle, Abadir led prayer as Imam and inquired about the states grim condition.

Conflict and decline
According to thirteenth century Arab geographer Ibn Sa'id al-Maghribi, the country of Harla was east of the Ethiopian Empire and north of Zanj. Harla clans descendant from Sa'ad ad-Din II participated in the sixteenth century Ethiopian–Adal War. Ibn Said further states the Harla territory passed the Blue Nile, north east and ended near the shores, the Harla made a living in the gold and silver mines.

According to Ethiopian accounts, in the 14th century, the Harla led by their Imam Salih allied with the Ifat Sultanate and battled the forces of emperor Amda Seyon I in what is now Somaliland which was Harla occupied. In the 15th century, Emperor Zara Yaqob of Ethiopia sold several Abba Estifanos of Gwendagwende supporters to Harla slave traders of Adal as punishment for joining the Stephanite sect labelled heretic by the Ethiopian Orthodox Tewahedo Church. A power struggle had developed in the early 16th century between Harla emirs of Harar and Walashma dynasty in which Ahmad ibn Ibrahim al-Ghazi would assume power by executing the Walashma Sultan Abu Bakr ibn Muhammad.

In the middle of the 16th century, the Adal Sultanate led by Harla and their Somali allies invaded Abyssinia. The Ethiopian–Adal War was in response to the death of Harla leader of Adal, Imam Mahfuz, killed in single combat, by the warrior-monk Gebre Andrias in the early reign of Emperor Dawit II. In the wars against Emperor Sarsa Dengel, the Harla led by the Sultanate of Harar.

The late sixteenth century saw Oromo people invading regions of Ethiopia and Somalia from southern portions such as Lower Juba, incorporating the Harla people. In 1577 Harla would move the Adal capital to the oasis of Aussa, and later create the Imamate of Aussa before being overthrown by the Mudaito dynasty in the eighteenth century. In 1893 British led expeditions, came across an ancient town in Nugaal Valley, Somalia, the local Dhulbahante clan alleged the Harla had lived in the area before the Oromo invasions. In 2017, a Harla town that produced jewelry was discovered by archaeologists. The architecture of a mosque found affirmed Harla had ties with Islamic centers in Tanzania and Somaliland. The Harla tribe's disappearance could have been due to the Ethiopian–Adal War in the sixteenth century, destitution, or assimilation.

Strong evidence suggests that during the Oromo migrations, the remaining Harla retreated behind the walls of Harar and were able to survive culturally. Local folklore from the Harla village near Dire Dawa, however, claim the Harla were farmers from the Ogaden and went extinct because of their arrogance, refusing to fast in Ramadan, and attempts to have the Quran written in Harla, hence were cursed by God. According to the Gadabuursi clan, the Harla committed major sins through excessive pride. Enrico Cerulli and others state Harla were a distinct group originating from the Harari region however due to the collapse of Adal, they were assimilated by Somalis.

Affiliated clans

Many Somali clans have links to the Harla. Most particularly the Issa subclan of the Dir. Within the Issa, the Harla are found within 2 clan divisions. The first being the Horroone clan division, where they are called Harla, and they are also found within the Eeleye clan division as Bah Harla and Harla Muse. All segments regard themselves as Dir. Sihab ad-Din Ahmad bin Abd al-Qader's Futūh al-Habaša explicitly ascribes a non-Somali ethnic origin to the Harla, whilst Darod traditions connect Harla to the Darod. In the modern era, the Harla have been reduced to insignificance under the Somali Darod clan. According to historian Ali Jimale Ahmed, the surviving Harla dwelling in the Harari kingdom were absorbed by Somalis after the sixteenth century. According to Sara Fani, some Afar clans in the Afar region claim Harla descent. The Darod sub clan Harti and Geri are furthermore according to tradition, the brothers of Harla. The Karanle sub clan of Hawiye also claims to have birthed the Harla.

According to some, the Karrayyu and Ittu clans are considered to have connections with Harla. It is believed the extinct Harla were incorporated into Karrayyu and Ittu. 

The Afar also have tribes linked to Harla called Kabirtu. In Afar region, clans named after Harla are found among farmers in Aussa, and Awash district between Dubti and Afambo. The moniker of clans proposes a fusion between native and immigrating tribes.

Hadiya people are believed to be originally descendants of the Harla people.

The Siltes (East Gurage) are also believed to be the descendants of the Harla people. Harari, Silte and Zay are the only people who speak a language that is related to Harla.

The Harari people are considered to be the closest remaining link to the Harla people. According to Hararis, the Harari ethnic group consist of seven Harla subclans: Abogn, Adish, Awari, Gidaya, Gaturi, Hargaya, and Wargar. Some sources claim Harla were a less Semitic version of the Harari.

Language

Field research by Enrico Cerulli identified a modern group called the "Harla" living amongst the Somali in the region between the cities of Harar and Jijiga. Encyclopaedia Aethiopica suggests that this population "may be a remnant group of the old [Harla], that integrated into the Somali genealogical system, but kept a partially separate identity by developing a language of their own." Cerulli published some data on this Harla community's language, called af Harlaad, which resembled the Somali languages spoken by the Yibir and Madhiban low-caste groups.And Muse clan

According to historian Richard Wilding Harla were ancient Cushitic however ethnologist Ulrich Braukämper suggests a Semitic variation which he labels "Harala-Harari" later developed in the Islamic period. Harala-Harari speakers were evidently disrupted by the Oromo migrations, leading to isolated related Semitic languages of Harari surviving in the walled city of Harar, Zay language on the island of Lake Zway and in parts of eastern Gurage territory such as Siltʼe language. 

Nicholas Tait proposes Harla language was indistinguishable with Argobba and Harari linguistic classifications. Ewald Wagner believes Harla were Semitic speakers related to Harari and Silte languages.

Notable Harlans

Mahfuz, Imam and General of the Adal Sultanate

See also
Kabir
Wolane people

Further reading
 Richard Wilding, The Arla, the Argobba and Links between the Coast and the Highlands. A Preliminary Archeological Survey. Addis Ababa University, Faculty of Arts, 1975

References

Works cited
 
 
 
 
 

Afroasiatic peoples
Ethnic groups in Ethiopia
Ethnic groups in Somalia
Extinct ethnic groups